Henry Abbott (15 March 1895 – 1968) was an English professional footballer who played as a goalkeeper in the Football League for Nelson, Luton Town and Rochdale. He also played for newly formed Wigan Athletic in their inaugural season.

References

Footballers from Preston, Lancashire
English footballers
Lancaster City F.C. players
Portsmouth F.C. players
Nelson F.C. players
Luton Town F.C. players
Exeter City F.C. players
Rochdale A.F.C. players
Wigan Athletic F.C. players
English Football League players
Association football goalkeepers
1895 births

1968 deaths